"Waldorf Stories" is the sixth episode of the fourth season of the American television drama series Mad Men, and the 45th overall episode of the series. It was written by Brett Johnson and series creator and executive producer Matthew Weiner, and directed by Scott Hornbacher. The episode originally aired on the AMC channel in the United States on August 29, 2010. This was the same evening that Mad Men received the award for Outstanding Drama Series at the 2010 Primetime Emmy Awards.

Plot

It is now April 1965. Don Draper (Jon Hamm) and a few other senior members of the firm attend the CLIO Awards where Don's Glo-Coat commercial is up for nomination. After being awarded the Clio, the team, already slightly drunk, plan to continue celebrating but only after returning to the office first. With the Life Cereal meeting already in progress, they decide to interrupt and take over the proceedings.
Don presents the rehearsed pitch but whether down to his inebriated state or it simply being an ineffective campaign, Life reject the work. Extremely confident after his recent win, Don insists upon coming up with a new idea there on the spot. Following several mediocre efforts he eventually finds success. The client likes one slogan in particular, Life - "the cure for the common breakfast", which Don has inadvertently stolen from Danny Siegel (Danny Strong), a seemingly dim-witted applicant for a job at the firm and Roger's wife's cousin. After the conclusion of the meeting, Don returns to the celebration losing an entire weekend to debauchery. He leaves the party with a brunette jingle-writer (who also won an award), only to awaken two days later in bed with a blonde waitress of whom he has no recollection. To his dismay and for no obvious reason, the waitress refers to him by his true name, "Dick Whitman."

Peggy Olson (Elisabeth Moss) is still upset that Don has not acknowledged her contribution to the award-winning ad and to make matters worse, he instructs her to resolve her issues with the new art director Stan Rizzo (Jay R. Ferguson). As they spend a weekend together working in a hotel room (where Don admonished them to stay until they came up with an ad, by Monday), she finds a way to counter Stan's accusations that she is uptight. Pete Campbell (Vincent Kartheiser), meanwhile, is not pleased that Lane Pryce (Jared Harris) is trying to hire Ken Cosgrove (Aaron Staton) to join the firm.

On Sunday, an angry Betty Francis (January Jones) telephones and awakens Don; he has forgotten to pick up his children, thus ruining Betty and Henry's plans to attend an important brunch event. Until then, Don did not even realize it was Sunday. Peggy visits Don to advise him the slogan he successfully pitched to Life was Danny's, and to insist that he make it right. On Monday, Don enters his office and is surprised to see Danny is waiting for him. Don attempts to buy the slogan, but Danny refuses the offer of money, insisting he wants a job. Don gives in to the younger man's demands, not bothering to hide his disgust, as he is unable to otherwise correct his mistake.

Lane explains the firm's need for Ken to help increase sales as Roger Sterling (John Slattery) is a "child" and Pete cannot shoulder all the rainmaking responsibility himself, apologizes for not previously telling him of the firm's plans to rehire Pete's old rival Ken Cosgrove (without first consulting him, much less keeping him in the loop), and invites Pete to a lunch meeting with Ken. Pete objects, insisting that Ken first meet with him privately. At the meeting, Pete agrees to accept Ken, on the condition that Ken accepts and pays due respect to Campbell's rank in SCDP. Ken agrees, and the two then convivially discuss Ken's wedding plans.

In flashbacks, Roger (who is writing a memoir), remembers how he met Don as a fur salesman in 1953. During that time, Roger was involved with Joan Holloway, for whom he sought to buy a fur coat. When Don learns the older man works in advertising, he tries to include his resume and portfolio in the box containing the coat, but Roger throws them out. Later, while heading to work, he runs into Don, who is hounding him for a job at Sterling Cooper. Despite trying to blow him off, Roger agrees to go out with him for drinks. The next day, Don shows up in the lobby and claims Roger hired him in saying: "Welcome aboard." As they enter the elevator, a puzzled Roger has no memory of what really happened, but Don smiles to himself, having successfully hustled his way into Sterling Cooper.

Reception
On its original American broadcast on August 29, 2010, on AMC, the episode was viewed by 2.04 million people.

The episode received very positive reviews from most critics. John Swansburg, reviewing the episode for Slate, appreciated the episode as an opportunity to "explore in greater detail a series of related questions" the season had presented so far. This included the relation between the old, experienced employees at the firm and the younger, more ambitious ones. He also highlighted the scene where Peggy chastises Don for his misappropriation of the slogan, as an example of how reduced Don has become as a man. Walter Dellinger of The Wall Street Journal wondered whether Weiner had "lost control of this show", with Don's dramatic emotional swings. He did, however, enjoy Peggy's redeeming herself by humiliating Stan, after initially feeling under-appreciated at the firm. TIME's James Poniewozik gave the episode a generally good review, praising the "small details in the flashback scenes". On the other hand, he did find some of the "lighter elements", such as the challenging secretary Mrs. Blankenship, somewhat out of place in the show.

References

External links
 "Waldorf Stories" at AMC
 

Mad Men (season 4) episodes
2010 American television episodes